Mitja Robar (born 4 January 1983) is a retired Slovenian ice hockey player.

Playing career
Robar has spent the majority of his career in Slovenia, playing for HDK Maribor, HK Slavija Ljubljana and HDD Olimpija Ljubljana of the Slovenian Championship league. In 2011 he was under a try-out contract with the Växjö Lakers Hockey of the Elitserien (SEL) until 15 October 2011. However, he was subsequently loaned to IK Oskarshamn of the HockeyAllsvenskan (Swe-1) after failing to make the Lakers' startup lines.

After being denied an extended contract, Robar moved to Finland to sign a one-year contract (with an optional one-year extension) with Lukko of the SM-liiga.

On 27 June 2016, Robar signed his first contract as a free agent in Austria, agreeing to a one-year deal with EC KAC.

He participated at several IIHF World Championships as a member of the Slovenia men's national ice hockey team.

Career statistics

Regular season and playoffs

International

References

External links

1983 births
Living people
Sportspeople from Maribor
Slovenian ice hockey defencemen
HDK Maribor players
HK Slavija Ljubljana players
HDD Olimpija Ljubljana players
HK Acroni Jesenice players
IK Oskarshamn players
Lukko players
Krefeld Pinguine players
BK Mladá Boleslav players
EC KAC players
KHL Medveščak Zagreb players
HK Olimpija players 
Slovenian expatriate sportspeople in Sweden
Slovenian expatriate sportspeople in Finland
Slovenian expatriate sportspeople in Germany
Slovenian expatriate sportspeople in the Czech Republic
Slovenian expatriate sportspeople in Austria
Slovenian expatriate sportspeople in Croatia
Olympic ice hockey players of Slovenia
Ice hockey players at the 2014 Winter Olympics
Ice hockey players at the 2018 Winter Olympics
Expatriate ice hockey players in Sweden
Expatriate ice hockey players in Finland
Expatriate ice hockey players in Germany
Expatriate ice hockey players in the Czech Republic
Expatriate ice hockey players in Austria
Expatriate ice hockey players in Croatia
Slovenian expatriate ice hockey people